{{Infobox person
| name               = Junko Noda
| image              = 
| alt                = 
| caption            = 
| native_name        = 野田 順子
| native_name_lang   = ja
| birth_name         = 
| birth_date         = 
| birth_place        = Naniwa-ku, Osaka, Japan
| death_date         = 
| death_place        = 
| nationality        = Japanese
| other_names        = 
| occupation         = Voice actress, singer
| years_active       = 1993–present
| agent              = 
| known_for          = 
| children           = 
| notable_works      = His and Her Circumstances as Maho Izawa  Love Hina as Mitsune "Kitsune" Konno  Haibane Renmei as Reki  Last Exile as Dio Eraclea  Tokyo Mew Mew as Zakuro Fujiwara  Major as Momoko Hoshino  Digimon Adventure 02 as Veemon
| height             = 163 cm
| website            = 
}}

 is a Japanese freelance voice actress and singer from Naniwa-ku, Osaka. She often voices boyish girls and boys, and since she herself lived in Osaka until the age of 21, she also voices characters with Kansai dialect in supporting roles.

Filmography
Television animationBest Student Council - Nanaho KinjoBleach - Tatsuki Arisawa, ShunoBoys Be... - Mizuki TakanoDetective Conan - Eisuke HondouDaphne in the Brilliant Blue - MillyDigimon Adventure 02 - VeemonEureka Seven: AO - BartenderFate/stay night - Shiro Emiya (young)Fate/stay night: Unlimited Blade Works - Shiro Emiya (young)Fate/Zero - Shiro Emiya (young)Gosick - Julie GuileGreat Teacher Onizuka - Miyabi AizawaGun X Sword - Joshua LundgrenHaibane Renmei - RekiHis and Her Circumstances - Maho IsawaHugtto! PreCure - Harriham Harry (fairy form)Inuyasha - Bunza SuekichiLast Exile- Dio EracleaLast Exile: Fam, The Silver Wing - Dio EracleaKirby: Right Back at Ya! - LovelyLove Hina - Mitsune KonnoMaburaho - Kaori IbaMagical Shopping Arcade AbenobashiMega Man NT Warrior - IceMan MaddyMega Man NT Warrior: Axess - IceMan MaddyOban Star-Racers - Molly / Eva WeiOne Piece - Tashigi, Kappa, Haruta, Franky (young)Record of Lodoss War: Chronicles of the Heroic KnightSgt. Frog - KararaSoul Eater - Mira NaigusSoul Eater Not! - Mira NaigusSquid Girl - Noh Mask RiderTenchi Muyo! War on Geminar - Aura ShurifonToday's Menu for the Emiya Family - Otoko Hotaruzuka, Shiro Emiya (young)Tokyo Mew Mew - Zakuro Fujiwara, MashaTokyo Underground - Shalma RufisToriko - Chirin xxxHolic - YuriYuri's World - Pig

Original video animation (OVA)Tenchi Muyo! War on Geminar (2009) - Aura Shurifon

Theatrical animationOne Piece Movie: The Desert Princess and the Pirates: Adventures in Alabasta (2007) - KappaDigimon Adventure: Last Evolution Kizuna (2020) - V-monDigimon Adventure 02: The Beginning (TBA) - V-mon

Video gamesTokimeki Memorial 2 (1999) - Hinomoto HikariInuyasha  (2001) – SuekichiDigimon ReArise (2018) - V-monArknights (2022) - Blacknight

 Other voice roles 
 Dynasty Warriors series as Xing Cai (also in Warriors Orochi series)
 Rockman X8 as Lumine 
 Tales of Eternia as Celsius, Chat 
 Segagaga as Tarō Sega
 Suikoden Tierkreis as Atrie
 Saki: The Nationals'' as Ikuno Akasaka (substitute coach of Himematsu)

Music 
In 2005, Noda provided vocals for an EP with Japanese guitarist Jun Senoue entitled "Ready!". The project is called JxJ (Jun x Junko) and is only available in Japan, though copies have made their way stateside through the Jun Senoue fan page. A notable entry in this album is a vocal cover of "Azure Blue World" from the 1998 video game Sonic Adventure, for which Jun Senoue composed music.

References

External links 
  
 
 

1971 births
Living people
Voice actresses from Osaka
Japanese voice actresses
Musicians from Osaka
21st-century Japanese women singers
21st-century Japanese singers
Aoni Production voice actors